Gupteswor cave is one of the major attractions of Kusma, Parbat.

In the western part of Nepal is the popular Himalayan region of Dhaulagiri, which is divided into four districts: Parbat, Baglung, Mustang, Myagdi. Kusma, the headquarters of Parbat District, has various natural and cultural attractions.

It is about a mile (0.6 km) from the Kusma, the financial capital of the district.

History
The old name of this cave is 'BhaluDulo'. Around 1940, a few local men saw a very strange place, covered by debris and grasses near the Kaligandaki river. Many people were curious about it, and they cleared the outermost part of debris and grasses, and then entered into the cave. They found an unbelievable (to them), strange dark area full of various statues and portraits of Hindu Gods and Goddesses. A very strange sound of a waterfall inside the cave, the statue of Pandava in rocks, Mahadev and Parvati, Saraswati, Nageswor and other goddess statues are interesting to see. It is considered to be one of the longest caves in Nepal. 

Most of the inside part of the cave is made up of deposition of calcium carbonate dissolved from surrounding limestone, with ground water which is a general concept of forming most of the cave. All statues and all portraits which can be seen inside the cave are natural. Chaite Dashain and Mahashivaratri are the most important days to visit the Gupteswar Cave for the Hindu prayers. Many species of bats inside the cave are also an attraction for visitors.

Buildings and structures in Parbat District
Caves of Nepal